Re-Arrange Us is the fifth album by American indie pop band Mates of State, on Barsuk Records, released on May 20, 2008. The first single from the album is "Get Better".

Track listing
 "Get Better"
 "Now"
 "My Only Offer"
 "The Re-Arranger"
 "Jigsaw"
 "Blue and Gold Print"
 "Help Help"
 "You Are Free"
 "Great Dane"
 "Lullaby Haze"

Remixes 
 wait what - can't get enough now (J. Cole vs Mates of State) featuring "Now"

External links
 Band official website

References

 

2008 albums
Mates of State albums
Barsuk Records albums